Igor Igorevich Matvienko (born February 6, 1960, in Moscow, RSFSR) is a Soviet and Russian producer, composer, founder of the bands Lyube, Ivanushki International, Korni, Fabrika, KuBa. He was also the producer for the singers Zhenya Belousov,  Victoria Dayneko, Irson Kudikova, Sati Kazanova and others.

Compositions 
Igor Matvienko wrote many songs in collaboration with Alexander Shaganov. In 2016, the anthem of the Russian Ground Forces (“Forward, infantry!") was written by Matvienko. A number of songs were written in collaboration with the poet Mikhail Andreev.

References

External links
 Продюсерский центр Игоря Матвиенко
 

1960 births
Living people
Musicians from Moscow
Russian composers
Russian male composers
Soviet composers
Soviet male composers
Russian pop musicians
Russian songwriters
Fabrika Zvyozd
Russian record producers
Russian National Music Award winners
20th-century Russian male musicians